Israeli athletes competed at the 1988 Summer Olympics in Seoul, South Korea.

Competitors
The following is the list of number of competitors in the Games.

Results by event

Boxing

Gymnastics

Sailing

Shooting

Swimming

Tennis

Wrestling

References

Nations at the 1988 Summer Olympics
1988
Summer Olympics